Diuris brumalis, commonly known as the winter donkey orchid, is a species of orchid that is endemic to the south-west of Western Australia. It is one of the first species of donkey orchid to flower in Western Australia each year and its flowers have been shown to attract the same insects that pollinate other species, but without offering a food reward.

Description
There is a single yellow ridge  in the mid-line of the labellum. Flowering occurs from June to August.

Taxonomy and naming
Diuris brumalis was first described in 1991 by David Jones from a specimen collected near Kalamunda and the description was published in Australian Orchid Research. The specific epithet (brumalis) is a Latin word meaning "of the shortest day", referring to the winter flowering of this species.

Distribution and habitat
The winter donkey orchid grows in shrubland and forest between Jurien Bay and Collie in the Avon Wheatbelt, Jarrah Forest and Swan Coastal Plain biogeographical regions of Western Australia.

Ecology
The flowers of this orchid resemble those of some Oxylobium and Daviesia species and are visited by the same native bees that pollinate them, even though the orchid does not reward the insects with nectar or pollen.

Conservation
Diuris brumalis is classified as "not threatened" by the Western Australian Government Department of Parks and Wildlife.

References

brumalis
Endemic orchids of Australia
Orchids of Western Australia
Endemic flora of Western Australia
Plants described in 1991